The 1987–88 Liga Leumit season saw the league experiment with a split-league system. After the first two rounds (26 matches), the league split, with the top eight clubs forming a Championship group and the bottom six forming a Relegation group. Within the groups, the clubs played each other once more.

Hapoel Tel Aviv won the title whilst Hapoel Lod and Maccabi Petah Tikva were relegated to Liga Artzit. Zahi Armeli of Maccabi Haifa was the league's top scorer with 25 goals.

The following season the league continued to use the split league system, but had six clubs in the Championship group and eight in the Relegation group.

Regular season

Table

Results

Playoffs

Top playoff

Table

Results

Bottom playoff

Table

Results

References
Israel - List of Final Tables RSSSF

Liga Leumit seasons
Israel
1